Frederik Nielsen and Joseph Sirianni were the defenders of championship title.
Jamie Delgado and Lovro Zovko became the new champions, after their won 7–6(6), 6–1, against Charles-Antoine Brézac and Vincent Stouff.

Seeds

Draw

Draw

References
 Doubles Draw

Guzzini Challenger - Doubles
Guzzini Challenger